Weldra is a white South African wine grape variety that is a crossing of Chenin blanc and Trebbiano. According to wine expert Jancis Robinson, Weldra can maintain good acidity levels through ripening but tends to produce rather neutral tasting wines.

See also
Chenel, another white South African grape variety that is a crossing of Chenin blanc and Trebbiano

References

White wine grape varieties